Microferonia is a genus of beetles in the family Carabidae, containing the following species:

 Microferonia adelaidae Blackburn, 1890
 Microferonia alticola Baehr, 1998 
 Microferonia anchomenoides Macleay, 1871 
 Microferonia avicapitis Baehr, 1998 
 Microferonia baro Darlington, 1968 
 Microferonia cinctipennis Sloane, 1898 
 Microferonia habbemae Baehr, 1998 
 Microferonia howei Moore, 1992 
 Microferonia lucanoides (Andrewes, 1933) 
 Microferonia marginata Castelnau, 1867

References

Licininae